Nhek Bun Chhay (born 1956) is a Cambodian politician and leader of the Khmer National United Party. Prior to his career in the military, he began as a rebel and supported the royalist forces of Funcinpec until he rose to the rank of general. He began his career as a politician after the downfall of Funcinpec and founded his own political party.

References

External links
 Leaner Bun Chhay vows to fight on. By  Jason Barber. The Phnom Penh Post, 15 August 1997.

Members of the National Assembly (Cambodia)
FUNCINPEC politicians
People from Battambang province
Living people
1958 births